HMS Superb was a 80-gun second rate  ship of the line built for the Royal Navy in the 1840s. She was broken up in 1869.

Description
The Vanguard class was designed by Sir William Symonds, Surveyor of the Navy, with each ship built with a slightly different hull shape to evaluate their speed and handling characteristics. The ship's tonnage was 2,583  tons burthen. The Vanguards had a wartime crew of 720 officers and ratings.
 
The Vanguard class ships of the line were armed with twenty 32-pounder (56 cwt) cannon and two 68-pounder carronades on her lower gundeck, twenty-eight 32-pounder (50 cwt) cannon and another pair of 68-pounder carronades on the upper gundeck. On her quarterdeck were fourteen 32-pounder (42 cwt) cannon and on the forecastle deck were eight more 32-pounder (42 cwt) cannon.

Construction and career

Superb was ordered from Pembroke Dockyard on 15 June 1838 and laid down the following November. She was launched on 6 September 1842 and was towed to Plymouth for fitting out by 26 April 1845. Her construction cost £54,979 and fitting out cost an additional £25,313.

After commissioning, Superb joined the Channel Fleet under the command of Captain Armar Lowry Corry. In February 1845, she joined the Experimental Squadron of eight ships, four of them built by Symonds. They engaged in three competitive cruises to test Symonds’ new hull designs against older, traditionally built warships. The whole Squadron was reviewed by Queen Victoria and Prince Albert at Spithead on 22 June and the trials were completed by December, Superb having proved to be the fastest ship in the last cruise. Overall, the results were inconclusive and became mired by political wrangling and professional rivalry, with the result that Symonds resigned. Superb took part in further trials the following year with yet more ships, this time called The Squadron of Evolution. The whole project was made irrelevant by the advent of steam propulsion and the Vanguard class were some of the last major Royal Navy warships to rely solely on sail propulsion.

In November 1848, Superb joined the Mediterranean Fleet, and continued there until paying off into the reserve at HM Dockyard, Chatham in June 1852. Superb was broken up in 1869.

Notes

Citations

References
Lavery, Brian (2003) The Ship of the Line - Volume 1: The Development of the Battlefleet 1650-1850. Conway Maritime Press. .

 

Ships of the line of the Royal Navy
Vanguard-class ships of the line
Ships built in Pembroke Dock
1842 ships